is the second dodge ball game developed by Million and published by Atlus. The game combines elements of Super Dodge Ball with growth sim elements. Similar to Super Dodge Ball Advance, this game has no Kunio-kun characters.

A planned deluxe pack version of the game includes guide book and a set of 12 postcards, but the plan was scrapped. The items became available through early orders of the game. In addition, pre-orders through Sofmap, Messe Sanoh, Gamers received a telephone card.

Teams

Player team
Holy Pegasus
Lightning Knights
Soul Sabers
Crimson Phoenix

Rival team
Mystic Mermaid
Dual Valkyria
Silent Vipers
Fortune Angels
Tall Crusader
Wild Lynx

External links
Atlus page
Anime News Service - January 1-15 Anime News
GAME Watch preview
Kirin review

2002 video games
Dodgeball video games
Japan-exclusive video games
Kunio-kun
PlayStation (console) games
PlayStation (console)-only games
Video games developed in Japan
Video games featuring female protagonists